The Workers Party Pakistan was a left-wing political party in Pakistan formed in March, 2010 by the merger of National Workers Party Pakistan, Communist Mazdoor Kissan Party, Peoples Rights Movement Pakistan, Awami Mazdoor Anjuman and Watan Dost Mazdoor Federation.

Formation
To link the national and international progressive movements and to establish a democratic order in which elitist class can not dominate the politics and economy of the country, five progressive, democratic political parties along with different regional groups of trade unionists, intellectuals and youth decided to form the  Workers Party Pakistan on March 21, 2010. Abid Hassan Minto was elected as president and Akhtar Hussain as general secretary.

Political struggle
After its formation, Workers Party Pakistan kept raising the voice on issues like foreign debt, release of political prisoners, gun violence and human rights violation, fair electoral system and privatization of public utilities.

Merger
Workers Party Pakistan (WPP) existed from March, 2010 to November, 2012. On November 11, 2012, the Workers Party Pakistan merged with two other left-wing parties, Labour Party Pakistan and Awami Party Pakistan to form Awami Workers Party.

Notable members 
 Chaudhry Fateh Muhammad (1923-2020)
 Abid Hassan Minto (previously from National Workers Party (NWP)
 Sufi Abdul Khaliq Baluch
 Yousuf Mustikhan (previously from National Workers Party)
 Akhtar Hussain
 Zahoor Khan (previously from Communist Mazdoor Kissan Party (CMKP)
 Ismat Shahjahan
 Aasim Sajjad Akhtar (previously from People's Rights Movement (PRM)

References

Awami Workers Party
Far-left politics in Pakistan
Secularism in Pakistan
Socialist parties in Pakistan